Roses & Razorblades is the second album by American rapper Hush. It was released on June 18, 2002.

Track listing

Personnel 
Daniel Carlisle - main artist, producer (tracks 1-5, 7-14)
Delbert Michael Greer - producer & guest artist (track 6)
Diana McNary - guest artist (track 5)
Frederick Beauregard - guest artist (track 7)
Michael Carlisle - guest artist (track 8)
Ryan Montgomery - guest artist (track 3)
Shane Capone - guest artist (tracks 1, 6)
BMX - producer (track 12)
Black Magic Crossing - guest artists (track 12)
DJ L - guest artist (track 5)
Nancy Carlisle - guest artist (track 13)
Seven - guest artist (track 5)

References 

2002 albums
Hush (rapper) albums